The Chief of Staff of the Republic of Korea Army (Korean: ,), shorten as CSA, is the professional head of the Republic of Korea Army (ROKA) since its foundation in 1948, originally held by a Lt. General, then by a General since 1968.

The appointment of the CSA, along with the Chief of Naval Operations, Chiefs of Staff of the Air Force and the Chairman of the Joint Chiefs of Staff, is referred to the State Council of South Korea for deliberation according to Article 89, Constitution of South Korea.

List of Chiefs

Commander of the Army

Chief of Staff of the Army

See also
Joint Chiefs of Staff (South Korea) 
Chief of Naval Operations (South Korea)
Chief of Staff of the Air Force (South Korea)
Republic of Korea Army
Republic of Korea Armed Forces
South Korea

References

 
South Korea